Parachute Express was an American band of three California-based entertainers who performed, wrote, and produced music for children. Members were Stephen Michael Schwartz, Janice Hubbard, and Donny Becker. Parachute Express gained national prominence as recording artists for Gymboree Play & Music, Walt Disney Records, and Trio Lane Records. They sang the theme song to the popular television series Jay Jay the Jet Plane and have been seen on TV shows Nickelodeon's Nick Jr. Rocks and Disney's Kaleidoscope Concerts. Their music was featured in over 550 Gymboree franchises throughout the world, as well as in preschools, daycare centers, and diverse informal education programs. Parachute Express created a total of twelve albums.

History
In the early 1990s, Parachute Express recorded for Walt Disney Records under the Music Box Artist Series. Since 1995, the trio has its own label, Trio Lane Records. Many of their albums have won national awards including NAPPA awards, the Film Advisory Board Award, an Indie Award, a Toy of The Year Award, and several times the Parents' Choice Gold Award.

Their long list of honors further included featured performers at the 42nd and 43rd Presidential Inaugural Festivities, performing their "poetic anthem" We The Children. This song was included in the Presidential library by then First Lady Hillary Clinton. They performed half a dozen times at the Annual Easter Egg Hunt on the lawn of the White House.

Their video Come Sing With Us! won the Parents Choice Video Award and an International Monitor Award. They have been voted "Best Group" by the American Academy of Children's Entertainment. In 2010 and 2011, Parachute Express toured China, performing in Nanjing, Shanghai, Beijing, Tianjin, Guangzhou, and Shenzhen. The group disbanded in late 2011.

Discography

Albums
 Shakin' It! (1984)
 Feel the Music (1991)
 Circle of Friends (1991)
 Happy to Be Here  (1991)
 Over Easy (1992)
 Sunny Side Up (1992)
 Friends, Forever Friends (1996)
 Who's Got A Hug? (1997)
 Dr. Looney's Remedy (1998)
 Don't Blink (2005)

Song collections
 Gymbo's Play and Pretend Favorites (2007)
 It's a Gymboree Party! (2007)

Singles
 Dr. Looney's Remedy (1995; The music video of this song is most notable for being on the previews of the VHS version of the 1995 film, A Goofy Movie.)
 The Coming of December (2005)

Tracks in compilations 
 Disney's Music Box: Disney's Spotlight (1992): Smooth Movin' Boogie Express
 The Man Who Ran Away with the Moon (1992): Smooth Movin' Boogie Express
 Pocahontas: The Enchanted Songs (1995)
 Exercise Party: Stretchin' and Jumpin' Songs for Young Children (2003): Can You Show Us; Reach Up High
 Hear and Gone in 60 Seconds: One Minute Songs by an Awesome Array of Award Winning Artists (2003): Alphabet Soup
 Jay Jay the Jet Plane: 24 Fun and Inspirational Stories for Kids (2003): Jay Jay the Jet Plane theme song
 Jay Jay the Jet Plane: 12 Fun and Inspirational Stories for Kids (2004): Jay Jay the Jet Plane theme song
 Songs for Little Boys: Trains, Cowboys, Pirates and More! (2004): I Like Trucks
 Songs for Little Princesses: Ballerinas, Best Friends, Dressing Up and More! (2004): Polka Dots, Checks and Stripes; Dress Up Queen
 Dance Party: Movin' and Groovin' Songs for Young Children (2006): Don't Blink; Dance, Puppet, Dance
 Favorite Lullabies: 15 Gentle Songs to Ease Your Baby to Sleep (2006): Good Night Moon
 Classic Animal Songs (2007): Me and My Dog
 Kindergarten Prep: Songs to Get Your Child Ready to Learn (2008): Tie a Bow; Red Means Stop

Videos
 1989 - Live In Concert (Gymboree)
 1995 - Come Sing With Us! (Disney)

Awards
 1991 - Parents' Choice for Feel the Music
 1995 - Parents' Choice Video Award for Come Sing With Us!
 1995 - International Monitor Award in the category Best Electronic Effects for Come Sing With Us!
 1998 - National Association of Parenting Publications of America (NAPPA) Gold Award for Doctor Looney's Remedy
 1999 - Best Group Award by the American Academy of Children's Entertainment
 1999 - Indie Award in the category Best Children's Album for Doctor Looney's Remedy
 2005 - Creative Child Magazine's Toy of the Year Award for Don't Blink
 2005 - NAPPA Gold Award for Don't Blink
 2005 - Parents Choice Gold Award for Don't Blink
 2008 - NAPPA Gold Award for It's a Gymboree Party

In popular culture
Emma Stone mentioned the Parachute Express song "Polka Dots, Checks, and Stripes" as the inspiration to her outfit at the 87th Annual Academy Awards Nominee Luncheon.

References

External links
 [ Parachute Express Bio] at Allmusic

Musical groups from Los Angeles
Musical groups established in 1984
American comedy musical groups
American children's musical groups
Comedians from California
Musical groups disestablished in 2011